The Udmurtia constituency (No.33) is a Russian legislative constituency in the Udmurtia. Until 2007 the constituency covered most of Udmurtia outside of Izhevsk and Votkinsk but currently the constituency is mostly located in northern Udmurtia and eastern Izhevsk.

Members elected

Election results

1993

|-
! colspan=2 style="background-color:#E9E9E9;text-align:left;vertical-align:top;" |Candidate
! style="background-color:#E9E9E9;text-align:left;vertical-align:top;" |Party
! style="background-color:#E9E9E9;text-align:right;" |Votes
! style="background-color:#E9E9E9;text-align:right;" |%
|-
|style="background-color:"|
|align=left|Mikhail Vasilyev
|align=left|Independent
|
|42.69%
|-
| colspan="5" style="background-color:#E9E9E9;"|
|- style="font-weight:bold"
| colspan="3" style="text-align:left;" | Total
| 
| 100%
|-
| colspan="5" style="background-color:#E9E9E9;"|
|- style="font-weight:bold"
| colspan="4" |Source:
|
|}

1995

|-
! colspan=2 style="background-color:#E9E9E9;text-align:left;vertical-align:top;" |Candidate
! style="background-color:#E9E9E9;text-align:left;vertical-align:top;" |Party
! style="background-color:#E9E9E9;text-align:right;" |Votes
! style="background-color:#E9E9E9;text-align:right;" |%
|-
|style="background-color:"|
|align=left|Mikhail Koshkin
|align=left|Agrarian Party
|
|40.57%
|-
|style="background-color:#D50000"|
|align=left|Nikolay Bushmelev
|align=left|Communists and Working Russia - for the Soviet Union
|
|18.74%
|-
|style="background-color:"|
|align=left|Mikhail Vasilyev (incumbent)
|align=left|Independent
|
|13.78%
|-
|style="background-color:"|
|align=left|Viktor Ganshin
|align=left|Independent
|
|13.10%
|-
|style="background-color:#000000"|
|colspan=2 |against all
|
|11.00%
|-
| colspan="5" style="background-color:#E9E9E9;"|
|- style="font-weight:bold"
| colspan="3" style="text-align:left;" | Total
| 
| 100%
|-
| colspan="5" style="background-color:#E9E9E9;"|
|- style="font-weight:bold"
| colspan="4" |Source:
|
|}

1999

|-
! colspan=2 style="background-color:#E9E9E9;text-align:left;vertical-align:top;" |Candidate
! style="background-color:#E9E9E9;text-align:left;vertical-align:top;" |Party
! style="background-color:#E9E9E9;text-align:right;" |Votes
! style="background-color:#E9E9E9;text-align:right;" |%
|-
|style="background-color:"|
|align=left|Svetlana Smirnova
|align=left|Independent
|
|64.31%
|-
|style="background-color:"|
|align=left|Mikhail Koshkin (incumbent)
|align=left|Independent
|
|9.57%
|-
|style="background-color:"|
|align=left|Klementy Rogovets
|align=left|Independent
|
|6.79%
|-
|style="background-color:"|
|align=left|Vladimir Podoprigora
|align=left|Independent
|
|4.24%
|-
|style="background-color:#FF4400"|
|align=left|Valery Nikulin
|align=left|Andrey Nikolayev and Svyatoslav Fyodorov Bloc
|
|3.07%
|-
|style="background-color:#000000"|
|colspan=2 |against all
|
|9.92%
|-
| colspan="5" style="background-color:#E9E9E9;"|
|- style="font-weight:bold"
| colspan="3" style="text-align:left;" | Total
| 
| 100%
|-
| colspan="5" style="background-color:#E9E9E9;"|
|- style="font-weight:bold"
| colspan="4" |Source:
|
|}

2003

|-
! colspan=2 style="background-color:#E9E9E9;text-align:left;vertical-align:top;" |Candidate
! style="background-color:#E9E9E9;text-align:left;vertical-align:top;" |Party
! style="background-color:#E9E9E9;text-align:right;" |Votes
! style="background-color:#E9E9E9;text-align:right;" |%
|-
|style="background-color:"|
|align=left|Svetlana Smirnova (incumbent)
|align=left|United Russia
|
|67.64%
|-
|style="background-color:"|
|align=left|Vladimir Bodrov
|align=left|Communist Party
|
|9.25%
|-
|style="background-color:"|
|align=left|Vladimir Krasilnikov
|align=left|Agrarian Party
|
|4.88%
|-
|style="background-color:"|
|align=left|Vladimir Danilov
|align=left|Liberal Democratic Party
|
|3.24%
|-
|style="background-color:"|
|align=left|Sergey Borodulin
|align=left|Rodina
|
|1.61%
|-
|style="background-color:#004090"|
|align=left|Andrey Yedigarev
|align=left|New Course — Automobile Russia
|
|1.45%
|-
|style="background-color:"|
|align=left|Anatoly Verbitsky
|align=left|Independent
|
|0.63%
|-
|style="background-color:#000000"|
|colspan=2 |against all
|
|9.57%
|-
| colspan="5" style="background-color:#E9E9E9;"|
|- style="font-weight:bold"
| colspan="3" style="text-align:left;" | Total
| 
| 100%
|-
| colspan="5" style="background-color:#E9E9E9;"|
|- style="font-weight:bold"
| colspan="4" |Source:
|
|}

2016

|-
! colspan=2 style="background-color:#E9E9E9;text-align:left;vertical-align:top;" |Candidate
! style="background-color:#E9E9E9;text-align:leftt;vertical-align:top;" |Party
! style="background-color:#E9E9E9;text-align:right;" |Votes
! style="background-color:#E9E9E9;text-align:right;" |%
|-
|style="background-color:"|
|align=left|Aleksey Zagrebin
|align=left|United Russia
|
|43.47%
|-
|style="background:"| 
|align=left|Aleksey Chulkin
|align=left|Party of Growth
|
|18.25%
|-
|style="background-color:"|
|align=left|Vladimir Chepkasov
|align=left|Communist Party
|
|15.02%
|-
|style="background:"| 
|align=left|Viktor Shudegov
|align=left|A Just Russia
|
|8.23%
|-
|style="background-color:"|
|align=left|Timur Yagafarov
|align=left|Liberal Democratic Party
|
|6.08%
|-
|style="background:"| 
|align=left|Roman Dementyev
|align=left|Communists of Russia
|
|2.60%
|-
|style="background:"| 
|align=left|Sergey Butorin
|align=left|Civic Platform
|
|1.48%
|-
|style="background:"| 
|align=left|Ildar Zakirov
|align=left|People's Freedom Party
|
|1.33%
|-
| colspan="5" style="background-color:#E9E9E9;"|
|- style="font-weight:bold"
| colspan="3" style="text-align:left;" | Total
| 
| 100%
|-
| colspan="5" style="background-color:#E9E9E9;"|
|- style="font-weight:bold"
| colspan="4" |Source:
|
|}

2021

|-
! colspan=2 style="background-color:#E9E9E9;text-align:left;vertical-align:top;" |Candidate
! style="background-color:#E9E9E9;text-align:left;vertical-align:top;" |Party
! style="background-color:#E9E9E9;text-align:right;" |Votes
! style="background-color:#E9E9E9;text-align:right;" |%
|-
|style="background-color:"|
|align=left|Andrey Isayev
|align=left|United Russia
|
|35.63%
|-
|style="background-color:"|
|align=left|Aleksandr Syrov
|align=left|Communist Party
|
|25.19%
|-
|style="background-color:"|
|align=left|Pavel Berlinsky
|align=left|New People
|
|7.28%
|-
|style="background-color:"|
|align=left|Lyudmila Korepanova
|align=left|Party of Pensioners
|
|7.05%
|-
|style="background-color: " |
|align=left|Farid Yunusov
|align=left|A Just Russia — For Truth
|
|6.81%
|-
|style="background-color:"|
|align=left|Aleksey Kuznetsov
|align=left|Liberal Democratic Party
|
|6.63%
|-
|style="background-color:"|
|align=left|Valery Khodyrev
|align=left|Communists of Russia
|
|3.06%
|-
|style="background-color:"|
|align=left|Aleksey Glukhov
|align=left|Rodina
|
|2.03%
|-
|style="background-color:"|
|align=left|Georgy Leshchev
|align=left|Green Alternative
|
|1.56%
|-
| colspan="5" style="background-color:#E9E9E9;"|
|- style="font-weight:bold"
| colspan="3" style="text-align:left;" | Total
| 
| 100%
|-
| colspan="5" style="background-color:#E9E9E9;"|
|- style="font-weight:bold"
| colspan="4" |Source:
|
|}

Notes

References

Russian legislative constituencies
Politics of Udmurtia